The Township of Muskoka Lakes is a municipality of the District Municipality of Muskoka, Ontario, Canada. It has a year-round population of 6,588.

The municipal offices are located in Port Carling.

History
The area now covered by the township was opened for settlement and organized in 1870 into the following geographic (and sometime municipal) townships of Watt, Cardwell, Humphrey, Christie, Medora and Wood.

In 1971, the current municipal structure took hold when Cardwell Township, Watt Township, Medora and Wood Townships, Bala, Port Carling, Windermere and part of Monck Township were merged.

Government 
Muskoka is governed by an elected Town Council consisting of a Mayor, District Councillors and Councillors representing each of the town's three wards. In addition, three Regional Councillors each represent a ward each. The Mayor and Councillors sit on the Muskoka County Council.

The members of the elected council as of the 2018 municipal election are:

Mayor: Phil Harding

District councillors:

 Ward 1: Ruth-Ellen Nishikawa
 Ward 2: Allen Edwards
 Ward 3: Frank Jaglowitz

Township councillors:

 Ward 1: Donelda Hayes
 Ward 1: Glenn Zavitz
 Ward 2: Susan Mazan
 Ward 2: Gordon Roberts
 Ward 3: Barb Bridgeman
 Ward 3: Peter Kelley

Geography

The township is located on Canadian Shield and thus is marked with outcrops of igneous rock and evergreen trees. Although inland from both Lake Huron's Georgian Bay and Lake Simcoe, the township contains the Muskoka Lakes consisting of Lake Muskoka, Lake Rosseau and Lake Joseph, amongst many other smaller lakes.

Protected areas in Muskoka Lakes include Hardy Lake Provincial Park and Torrance Barrens Conservation Area.

Communities
The township contains the communities of Bala, Bala Park, Bardsville, Barlochan, Beaumaris, Baysville,  Bear Cave, Beatrice, Bent River, Brackenrig, Cedar Village, Dee Bank, Dixon's Corners, Dudley, Duffy, Echo Beach, Ferndale, Foot's Bay, Glen Orchard, Gregory, Gull Rock, Hekkla, Inverness Lodge, Juddhaven, Mendora, Milford Bay, Minett, Morinus, Mortimers Point, Park Beach, Port Carling, Port Keewaydin, Port Sandfield, Raymond, Redwood, Roderick, Rossclair, Rosseau Falls, Rostrevor, Shannon Hall, Sunset Beach, Thorel House, Tomelin Bluffs, Torrance, Ufford, Ullswater, Valley Green Beach, Walkers Point, Willow Beach, Whiteside, Windermere, Woodington, Woodward Station and Ziska.

Climate

Demographics 

Economy
Timber was initially the greatest economic attraction for the region. The soil is poor and rocky and consequently is not especially suited to agriculture.

As the resource industries dried up, the area soon embraced tourism as its economic base because of its proximity to Toronto and the rest of Southern Ontario. For many Ontarians, this is the centre of cottage country.

The Muskoka Lakes Township Public Libraries offers research, literature, and cultural resources to local residents. The libraries consist of the Norma and Miller Alloway Muskoka Lakes Library main branch in the town of Port Carling, and three small branches housed in the community centres of Bala, Milford Bay, and Walker's Point.

Notable people

James Bartleman, politician and diplomat
Viola R. MacMillan, prospector and miner
John Wilson McConnell, sugar refiner, newspaper publisher, humanitarian and philanthropist

See also
List of townships in Ontario

References

 Tatley, Richard. Steamboating in Muskoka. Bracebridge, Ontario : Muskoka Litho, 1972.

External links

Township municipalities in Ontario
Lower-tier municipalities in Ontario
Municipalities in the District Municipality of Muskoka